The Steilacoom Catholic Church (also known as the Church of the Immaculate Conception) is a Roman Catholic church in Steilacoom, Washington, United States. It was originally built in 1855 near Fort Steilacoom, but was moved to its present location in 1864. It was the first Catholic church built in Washington. It was a mission church.

The church was added to the National Register of Historic Places in 1974.

See also
List of the oldest buildings in Washington (state)

References

Sources
 
 

Roman Catholic churches in Washington (state)
National Register of Historic Places in Pierce County, Washington
Roman Catholic Archdiocese of Seattle
Roman Catholic churches completed in 1855
19th-century Roman Catholic church buildings in the United States
Relocated buildings and structures in Washington (state)
Churches in Pierce County, Washington
Churches on the National Register of Historic Places in Washington (state)